Gaiutra Bahadur is a Guyanese-American writer. She is best known for Coolie Woman: The Odyssey of Indenture, which was shortlisted for the Orwell Prize in 2014.

Early life
Bahadur was born in New Amsterdam, East Berbice-Corentyne in rural Guyana and emigrated to the United States with her family when she was six years old. She grew up in Jersey City, New Jersey and earned her bachelor's degree, with honors in English Literature, at Yale University and her master's degree in journalism at Columbia University.

Career
Before winning a Nieman Fellowship at Harvard University when she was 32, she was a staff writer for The Philadelphia Inquirer and the Austin American-Statesman. In her decade as a daily newspaper reporter, she covered politics, immigration and demographics in Texas, Pennsylvania and New Jersey and spent three months in the spring of 2005, during the Iraq war, as a foreign correspondent in Knight Ridder's Baghdad bureau. Since then, she has worked as an essayist, literary critic and freelance journalist, contributing to The New York Times Book Review, The New York Review of Books, The Nation, The New Republic, Dissent and other publications.

Her book Coolie Woman was published in 2013. It is partly a narrative history of indentured women in the Caribbean and partly a family history focusing on her great-grandmother, Sujaria, who left Calcutta for British Guiana in 1903 to work as an indentured plantation labourer. The book was a finalist for the 2014 Orwell Prize and the Center for Documentary Studies Writing Prize at Duke University, and it won the New Jersey State Council on the Arts Award for Prose and Gordon K. and Sybil Lewis Prize. The Chronicle of Higher Education included the book in its round-up of the best scholarly books of the decade in 2020.

She collaborated with poet and translator Rajiv Mohabir to recover the only known text by an indentured immigrant in the Anglophone Caribbean, a songbook by Lal Bihari Sharma first published as a pamphlet in India in 1915. Mohabir's English translation, I Even Regret Night: Holi Songs of Demerara, was published in 2019 with an afterword by Bahadur, who first encountered the text in the British Library while doing research for Coolie Woman.

She is an associate professor of journalism at Rutgers University-Newark and has taught creative nonfiction at the University of Basel in Switzerland and Caribbean literature at City College of New York.

Bibliography
Books
  
 

Afterwords
  Afterword to 
  Afterword to 

Anthologies

Nonfiction
  In 
  In 
  In  
  In 
Fiction
  In 

Notable Articles and Essays

 Various articles for The Nation, The New Republic, The New York Review of Books, The New York Times Book Review, Dissent (American magazine), The Virginia Quarterly Review

Major Awards and Recognition
2018 Literary Arts Residency, Bellagio Center in Italy, The Rockefeller Foundation
2018 Scholar-in-Residence, The Schomburg Center for Research in Black Culture, The New York Public Library
2016-2017 Fellow, W.E.B. Du Bois Institute, Harvard University
2015 MacDowell Artists Colony Residency
2014 Orwell Prize (shortlist), Coolie Woman
2014 Bocas Prize for Caribbean Literature (nonfiction shortlist), Coolie Woman
Two-time winner of the New Jersey State Council on the Arts Award for Prose, 2013 and 2019
2007-2008 Nieman Fellow, Harvard University

References

External links

"Coolie Woman Rescues Indentured Women From Anonymity": National Public Radio*
"Salvaged Crossings”: Lauren Alleyne interviews Gaiutra Bahadur, Guernica*
"A Conversation with author Gaiutra Bahadur": India Ink Blog, The New York Times*
"Paperback Writer – Gaiutra Bahadur": The Guardian*
"Gaiutra Bahadur Interview with BBC Woman's Hour": BBC Radio Four*
"Coolitude Poetics": Rajiv Mohabir interviews Gaiutra Bahadur, Jacket 2*

1975 births
Living people
Guyanese women writers
Yale College alumni
Columbia University Graduate School of Journalism alumni
20th-century Guyanese writers
21st-century Guyanese writers
20th-century American women writers
21st-century American women writers
People from New Amsterdam, Guyana
Guyanese people of Indian descent
American people of Indo-Guyanese descent
American women writers of Indian descent